Tetraethylammonium tetrachloronickelate is the chemical compound with the formula (N(C2H5)4)2NiCl4. It is the tetraethylammonium salt of the blue-colored tetrahedral anion [NiCl4]2-. Several tetrachloronickelate salts are known. They are paramagnetic.

References

Chlorides
Nickel complexes
Metal halides